Chapter 9: Judiciary. Chapter 9 of the 1997 Constitution of Fiji is titled Judiciary.  It is divided into twenty-two sections, setting out the composition and functions of the Judicial branch of the Fijian government.

The three constitutional courts 

Section 117 establishes three courts: the High Court, the Court of Appeal, and the Supreme Court, and also make provision for other courts to be established by law.  The Supreme Court is declared to be "the final appellate court of the State" – in other words, there is no judicial authority higher than the Supreme Court.  In this respect, the Supreme Court takes over the functions formerly performed by the British Privy Council before Fiji became a republic in 1987.  The Court of Appeal is a new institution established by this constitution; the other two courts predate it.

Jurisdictions of the courts 
Section 118 declares the judges of all courts of the State to be independent of the legislative and executive branches of government.

Sections 119 through 122 set out the jurisdiction of the various courts.  The Supreme Court and High Court are declared to possess the jurisdiction they formerly possessed prior to the adoption of the Constitution; they, together with the Appeal Court also possess whatever authority may be conferred on them by the Constitution or by law.

The High Court is given unlimited "original jurisdiction" over any civil and criminal cases, constitutional disputes, and appeals from subordinate courts.  It is also vested with the authority to oversee all proceedings of subordinate courts, and to issue appropriate directives to such courts.

The Court of Appeal is given the right "to hear and determine appeals" from all judgments of the High Court.  From time to time, other powers may be assigned to this court by law.

The Supreme Court is given exclusive jurisdiction to hear and determine appeals from all final judgments of the Court of Appeal.  A case may be brought before the Supreme Court only if the Court of Appeal has determined to refer the case to it, or if the Supreme Court has, in its own judgment, decided to hear an appeal; proceedings in this court may not be initiated by individuals.  The Supreme Court has the power to review, vary, affirm, or discard decisions of the Court of Appeal, may order retrials, and may award costs to defendants and plaintiffs.  Decisions of the Supreme Court are binding on all subordinate courts.  The Supreme Court may, at its own discretion, review any judgment or decision that it has previously rendered.

Section 123 authorizes the President of Fiji, on the advice of the Cabinet, to ask the Supreme Court to rule on actual or potential disagreements pertaining to the Constitution.  The Supreme Court is required to pronounce its opinion in open court.

Section 124 empowers the Supreme Court, the Court of Appeal, and the High Court to punish persons for contempt of court.  The nature of this offence and of the appropriate punishments are to be prescribed by law.

Section 125 empowers the President of the Supreme Court (who is also the Chief Justice) to make rules, subject to the Constitution and to legislation, for the practice and procedures to be followed in the Supreme Court.

Composition of the courts and qualifications for judges 
Sections 126 through 128 set out the composition of the High Court, Court of Appeal, and Supreme Court.
 The High Court is chaired by the Chief Justice, and includes a minimum of ten puisne judges.  Parliament may also provide for the appointment of Masters of the High Court, or junior judges, with whatever powers Parliament may confer.
 The Court of Appeal is chaired by the President of the Court of Appeal.  The Chief Justice is not permitted to hold this position; the Court of Appeal is the only court from which the Chief Justice is constitutionally barred from membership.  This is to give the Court of Appeal a measure of independence from the other courts.  Also members of the Court of Appeal are the puisne judges of the High Court, and persons specifically appointed as Justices of Appeal.
 The Supreme Court is chaired by the Chief Justice and includes the Justices of Appeal, along with others appointed specifically to serve as judges of the Supreme Court.

Section 129 declares that "A judge who has sat in a trial of a matter that is the subject of appeal to a higher court must not sit in the appeal." As the membership of the three courts established by the Constitution overlaps to a large extent, this clause is inserted to prevent a conflict of interest.

Section 130 sets out the qualifications for judges.  A judge (of any court) must either be a qualified barrister or solicitor with a minimum of seven years' experience in Fiji or another country prescribed by law, or one who holds or has held a high judicial position in Fiji or another country prescribed by Parliament.  The judiciary is the only branch of government from which non-citizens are not excluded.  This is in recognition that as a developing country, the government may deem it in the national interest to look abroad for judges with expertise in various aspects of the law.  Accordingly, judges from the United Kingdom and New Zealand, among other countries, have sometimes served on Fiji's courts.

Judicial Services Commission 
Section 131 establishes the Judicial Service Commission.  It consists of the Chief Justice, who chairs the commission, the Chairperson of the Public Service Commission, and the President of the Fiji Law Society.  The commission is empowered to investigate complaints against judges and officials of courts that are subordinate to the High Court, and may take disciplinary actions against them.  The Commissioners are entitled to whatever allowances Parliament may determine.

Appointment of judicial officers 
Section 132 deals with the manner in which judges are to be appointed.  
 The Chief Justice is appointed by the President on the advice of the Prime Minister, who is required to consult with the Leader of the Opposition.  This does not give the Leader of the Opposition a veto, only the right to be consulted.
 The judges of the Supreme Court, the President of the Court of Appeal, the Justices of Appeal, and the puisne judges of the High Court are appointed by the President of Fiji, upon the nomination of the Judicial Service Commission, after consulting with the Cabinet Minister and the committee of the House of Representatives responsible for the administration of justice.  
 In the event of a vacancy in the office of Chief Justice, or in the event of the Chief Justice being unable to perform his duties due to absence, illness, or any other cause, the President may, on the advice of the Judicial Service Commission, following consultation by it with the appropriate Cabinet Minister, appoint another person (who must be qualified for appointment as a judge) to act in that capacity.
 In the event of the absence or incapacity of a puisne judge of the High Court, or in the event of a vacancy in such a position, the President may appoint someone to act in that capacity.  No person who is not qualified to fill the office may be appointed as an interim judge.

Section 133 empowers the Judicial Service Commission to appoint Magistrates, a central agricultural tribunal (to administer the Agricultural Landlord and Tenant Act), and any other judicial offices that may be established by Parliament.  Parliament may also empower the commission to make appointments to non-judicial offices.  In making its appointments, the Commission must consult with the Prime Minister and the Leader of the Opposition, and must obtain the Prime Minister's approval if a non-citizen is to be appointed to a judicial office (other than that of a judge).

Section 134 sets out the criteria for appointment to judicial office.  The first principle is that all judicial officers should be based on merit, filled by persons of "the highest quality."  The second principle is that, as far as practicable, the composition of the judiciary should reflect Fiji's ethnic balance and should aim for substantially equal representation of males and females.

Section 135 requires all judges, before taking office, to take the oath (prescribed in Part D of the Schedule) before the President of Fiji.

Section 136 forbids any reduction in the salary of judges during their terms of office.  This is intended as a safeguard against blackmail.

Terms of office 
Section 137 prescribes the terms of office and the retirement ages for judges.  
 The Chief Justice, Supreme Court Judges, and Justices of Appeal (including the President of the Court of Appeal), are required to retire on reaching the age of 70.  The retirement of Justices of Appeal may be waived, however, for a term of years or for the duration of one or more sessions of the court concerned.
 Puisne judges are appointed for terms of not less than four years, nor more than seven years, and are required to retire on the expiry of their term or at the age of 65, whichever event occurs sooner.
 Upon reaching the applicable retirement age, the retirement of the Chief Justice, any Supreme Court judge, or a Justice of Appeal (including the President of the Court of Appeal) may be waived to allow that person to continue in office, or to transfer to another judicial office, for a term of not more than three years.  This may be renewed, but not after the judge has reached the age of 75.  No person, therefore, may serve as a judge after the age of 78.
 The retirement of puisne judges at the age of 65 is compulsory and may not be waived.  They are eligible, however, for appointment as Justices of Appeal (including to the Presidency of the Court of Appeal), as judges of the Supreme Court, or to the office of Chief Justice.
 The retirement age of judges is not applicable to persons acting in that capacity on a temporary basis.  Judges who are past retirement age may therefore be called out of retirement, from time to time, to temporarily fill vacancies or to act in the place of a judge who is absent or otherwise unable to carry out his or her duties.

Removal from office 
Section 138 sets out the grounds, and the manner, in which a judge may be removed.  A judge may be dismissed only for misbehavior or for inability to perform his or her duties, owing to illness or metal incapacitation, or any other cause.

In the case of alleged misbehavior, the President appoints a tribunal consisting of not less than three persons, who must be past or present judges either in Fiji or another country prescribed by Parliament.  In the case of alleged inability to perform the functions of office, the President appoints a medical board, consisting of three qualified medical practitioners.  The President, acting on his or her own discretion, may dismiss a judge on the written recommendation of the tribunal or medical board.  The President may, at his or her own discretion, suspend from office any judge being investigated by a tribunal or medical board.  The suspension automatically ceases if the tribunal or medical board recommends that the judge not be removed from office.

Section 139 declares that all judges in office before the commencement of the Constitution remain in office under it.

References

1997 Constitution of Fiji
Judiciary of Fiji